Auguste Champetier de Ribes (30 July 1882 – 6 March 1947) was a French politician and jurist.

A devout Catholic, he was an early follower of Albert de Mun and social Christianity. Wounded in the First World War, he was elected to the Chamber of Deputies from the Basses-Pyrénées as a Christian Democrat (PDP) from 1924 to 1934. He was Senator from 1934 to 1940. He served as a junior minister or minister in various governments led by André Tardieu, Édouard Daladier, Paul Reynaud, and Pierre Laval.

In 1940, he was among the 80 parliamentarians who refused to give Pétain full powers (see The Vichy 80) and served in the Combat resistance movement. An early supporter of Charles de Gaulle, he was named by the Provisional Government of the French Republic as the French representative during the Nuremberg Trials. Upon his return, he was elected President of the Council of the Republic (now known as the French Senate) by the benefit of age. He had tied Communist Georges Marrane, but was elected because he was older than Marrane. Two days later, he was the defeated MRP candidate in the 1947 French presidential election. His health prevented him from assuming his role as President of the Council and he died in office.

References

|-

1882 births
1947 deaths
People from Antony, Hauts-de-Seine
French Roman Catholics
Politicians from Île-de-France
Popular Democratic Party (France) politicians
Popular Republican Movement politicians
French Ministers of Pensions
French Ministers of Veterans Affairs
Members of the 13th Chamber of Deputies of the French Third Republic
Members of the 14th Chamber of Deputies of the French Third Republic
Members of the 15th Chamber of Deputies of the French Third Republic
Presidents of the Senate (France)
French Senators of the Third Republic
French Senators of the Fourth Republic
Senators of Pyrénées-Atlantiques
French senators elected by the National Assembly
The Vichy 80
French military personnel of World War I
French Resistance members